Armington, Montana is a village in Cascade County, Montana near the town of Belt, Montana. The zip code is 59412

History
Armington has a history of being a commercial hub for Farmers, Ranchers, Miners and others living in the surrounding areas 
of Cascade County.  It is often referred to as Armington Junction because it is near where Armington Road meets U.S. Highway 89 and
U.S. Highway 87. Armington Junction provides access to many of the communities in Meagher and Park counties.

Recreation
Outdoor Recreation near Armington includes Sluice Boxes State Park, and hiking trails in the Little Belt Mountains.

References
 Cascade County Chamber of Commerce.

Unincorporated communities in Cascade County, Montana
Unincorporated communities in Montana